The 26th Online Film Critics Society Awards, honoring the best in film for 2022, were announced on January 23, 2023. The nominations were announced on January 18, 2023.

Everything Everywhere All at Once led the nominations with eleven, including Best Picture, followed by The Banshees of Inisherin with nine; the former won six awards, including Best Picture.

Winners and nominees

{| class="wikitable"
|-
! style="background:#EEDD82; width: 50%"| Best Picture
! style="background:#EEDD82; width: 50%"| Best Director
|-
| valign="top" |
 Everything Everywhere All at Once
  The Banshees of Inisherin
 Tár
 The Fabelmans
 Nope
 RRR
 Top Gun: Maverick
 Aftersun
 Women Talking
 EO
| valign="top" |
 Daniel Kwan and Daniel Scheinert – Everything Everywhere All at Once
 Todd Field – Tár
 Martin McDonagh – The Banshees of Inisherin
 Steven Spielberg – The Fabelmans
 Charlotte Wells – Aftersun
|-
! style="background:#EEDD82; width: 50%"| Best Actor
! style="background:#EEDD82; width: 50%"| Best Actress
|-
| valign="top" |
 Colin Farrell – The Banshees of Inisherin as Pádraic Súilleabháin
 Austin Butler – Elvis as Elvis Presley
 Brendan Fraser – The Whale as Charlie
 Paul Mescal – Aftersun as Calum Paterson
 Bill Nighy – Living as Mr. Williams
| valign="top" |
 Michelle Yeoh – Everything Everywhere All at Once as Evelyn Quan Wang
 Cate Blanchett – Tár as Lydia Tár
 Viola Davis – The Woman King as General Nanisca
 Danielle Deadwyler – Till as Mamie Till-Mobley
 Mia Goth – Pearl as Pearl
|-
! style="background:#EEDD82; width: 50%"| Best Supporting Actor
! style="background:#EEDD82; width: 50%"| Best Supporting Actress
|-
| valign="top" |
 Ke Huy Quan – Everything Everywhere All at Once as Waymond Wang
 Paul Dano – The Fabelmans as Burt Fabelman
 Brendan Gleeson – The Banshees of Inisherin as Colm Doherty
 Brian Tyree Henry – Causeway as James Aucoin
 Barry Keoghan – The Banshees of Inisherin as Dominic Kearney
| valign="top" |
 Kerry Condon – The Banshees of Inisherin as Siobhán Súilleabháin
 Angela Bassett – Black Panther: Wakanda Forever as Queen Ramonda
 Jamie Lee Curtis – Everything Everywhere All at Once as Deirdre Beaubeirdre
 Dolly de Leon – Triangle of Sadness as Abigail
 Stephanie Hsu – Everything Everywhere All at Once as Joy Wang / Jobu Tupaki
|-
! style="background:#EEDD82; width: 50%"| Best Animated Feature
! style="background:#EEDD82; width: 50%"| Best Film Not in the English Language
|-
| valign="top" |
 Guillermo del Toro's Pinocchio
 Apollo 10 1⁄2: A Space Age Childhood
 Marcel the Shell with Shoes On
 Puss in Boots: The Last Wish
 Turning Red
| valign="top" |
 Decision to Leave (South Korea) All Quiet on the Western Front (Germany)
 EO (Poland)
 No Bears (Iran)
 RRR (India)
|-
! style="background:#EEDD82; width: 50%"| Best Documentary
! style="background:#EEDD82; width: 50%"| Best Debut Feature
|-
| valign="top" |
 Fire of Love
 All That Breathes
 All the Beauty and the Bloodshed
 Good Night Oppy
 Moonage Daydream
| valign="top" |
 Charlotte Wells – Aftersun
 Alice Diop – Saint Omer
 John Patton Ford – Emily the Criminal
 Owen Kline – Funny Pages
 Panah Panahi – Hit the Road
 Domee Shi – Turning Red
|-
! style="background:#EEDD82; width: 50%"| Best Original Screenplay
! style="background:#EEDD82; width: 50%"| Best Adapted Screenplay
|-
| valign="top" |
 Martin McDonagh – The Banshees of Inisherin
 Todd Field – Tár
 Tony Kushner and Steven Spielberg – The Fabelmans
 Daniel Kwan and Daniel Scheinert – Everything Everywhere All at Once
 Jordan Peele – Nope
| valign="top" |
 Rian Johnson – Glass Onion: A Knives Out Mystery
 Noah Baumbach – White Noise
 Guillermo del Toro, Patrick McHale, and Matthew Robbins – Guillermo del Toro's Pinocchio
 Rebecca Lenkiewicz – She Said
 Sarah Polley – Women Talking
|-
! style="background:#EEDD82; width: 50%"| Best Cinematography
! style="background:#EEDD82; width: 50%"| Best Editing
|-
| valign="top" |
 Claudio Miranda – Top Gun: Maverick
 Ben Davis – The Banshees of Inisherin
 Florian Hoffmeister – Tár
 Janusz Kamiński – The Fabelmans
 Hoyte van Hoytema – Nope
| valign="top" |
 Paul Rogers – Everything Everywhere All at Once
 Eddie Hamilton – Top Gun: Maverick
 Michael Kahn and Sarah Broshar – The Fabelmans
 Matt Villa and Jonathan Redmond – Elvis
 Monika Willi – Tár
|-
! style="background:#EEDD82; width: 50%"| Best Costume Design
! style="background:#EEDD82; width: 50%"| Best Production Design
|-
| valign="top" |
 Black Panther: Wakanda Forever
 Babylon
 Elvis
 Everything Everywhere All at Once
 The Woman King
| valign="top" |
 Everything Everywhere All at Once
 Avatar: The Way of Water
 Babylon
 Elvis
 The Fabelmans
|-
! style="background:#EEDD82; width: 50%"| Best Original Score
! style="background:#EEDD82; width: 50%"| Best Visual Effects
|-
| valign="top" |
 Carter Burwell – The Banshees of Inisherin
 Michael Giacchino – The Batman
 Hildur Guðnadóttir – Women Talking
 Justin Hurwitz – Babylon
 John Williams – The Fabelmans
| valign="top" |
 Avatar: The Way of Water
 Everything Everywhere All at Once
 Nope
 RRR
 Top Gun: Maverick
|}

Special awards

Technical Achievement Awards
 Avatar: The Way of Water – 3D Effects Design
 RRR – Original Song: "Naatu Naatu"
 RRR – Stunt Coordination
 Tár – Sound Design
 Top Gun: Maverick – Stunt Coordination

Lifetime Achievement Awards
 Ruth E. Carter, costume designer
 Claire Denis, director
 Pam Grier, actor
 Barbara Kopple, documentarian
 Bruce Willis, actor

Special Achievement Awards
 Maya Cade and the Black Film Archive
 The Academy of Motion Picture Arts and Sciences Museum – for providing a site where all aspects of cinema can be displayed
 Geena Davis – actor, producer, Oscar and Golden Globe winner, founder of the Geena Davis Institute on Gender in Media and winner of the Jean Hersholt Humanitarian Award

Non-U.S. Releases
 Continental Drift (South) (Switzerland)
 Everybody Loves Jeanne (France)
 Kímmapiiyipitssini: The Meaning of Empathy (Canada)
 Love Life (Japan)
 Lullaby (Spain)
 Met Mes (Netherlands)
 My Grandfather's Demons (Portugal)
 My Small Land (Japan)
 Paris Memories (France)
 Run Woman Run (Canada)

Films with multiple nominations and awards

References

External links
 
 2022 Awards (26th Annual) at ofcs.org

2022 film awards
2022